Larry Allen Williams (born November 17, 1943, in Grafton, West Virginia) is an American politician and a Democratic member of the West Virginia House of Delegates representing District 52 since January 12, 2013. Williams served consecutively since his appointment October 8, 1993 to fill the vacancy caused by the resignation of Representative David Miller until January 2013 in the District 45 seat.

Education
Williams graduated from Tunnelton High School in 1961.

Elections
2012 Redistricted to District 52, and with incumbent Larry Kump redistricted to District 59, Williams was unopposed for the May 8, 2012 Democratic Primary, winning with 1,021 votes, and won the November 6, 2012 General election with 3,967 votes (80.4%) against Constitution Party candidate Rick Bartlett.
Early 1990s Initially appointed to District 45, Williams was elected in the 1994 Democratic Primary and the November 8, 1994 General election and re-elected in the November 5, 1996 General election.
1998 Williams was unopposed for the 1998 Democratic Primary and won the November 3, 1998 General election against Republican nominee Steve Bevins.
2000 Williams was unopposed for both the 2000 Democratic Primary and the November 7, 2000 General election.
2002 Williams was unopposed for the 2002 Democratic Primary and won the November 5, 2002 General election against Republican nominee William Means.
2004 Williams was unopposed for the 2004 Democratic Primary, and won the November 2, 2004 General election against Republican nominee David Batson.
2006 Williams was unopposed for both the 2006 Democratic Primary and the November 7, 2006 General election.
2008 Williams was unopposed for both the May 13, 2008 Democratic Primary, winning with 2,440 votes, and the November 4, 2008 General election, winning with 5,964 votes.
2010 Williams was unopposed for both the  May 11, 2010 Democratic Primary, winning with 1,700 votes, and the November 2, 2010 General election, winning with 4,758 votes.

References

External links
Official page at the West Virginia Legislature

Larry Williams at Ballotpedia
Larry A. Williams at OpenSecrets

1943 births
Living people
Democratic Party members of the West Virginia House of Delegates
People from Grafton, West Virginia
People from Preston County, West Virginia
United States Army soldiers